Clear Creek Township is a township in Marion County, Kansas, United States.  As of the 2010 census, the township population was 548, including the city of Lincolnville, and unincorporated communities of Antelope and east side of Pilsen.

Geography

Communities
The township contains the following settlements:
 City of Lincolnville.
 Unincorporated community of Antelope.
 Unincorporated community of Pilsen (east of Remington Road). The west part is located in Clark Township.

Cemeteries
The township contains the following cemeteries:
 Evangelical Lutheran Cemetery (aka Lincolnville Cemetery), located in Section 1 T18S R4E.
 Lincolnville Cemetery (aka Evangelical Luther Church Cemetery), located in Section 11 T18S R4E.
 Pilsen Cemetery (aka St. John Nepomocene Catholic Church Cemetery), located in Section 19 T18S R4E.

Transportation
U.S. Route 77 pass through the township.

References

Further reading

External links
 Marion County website
 City-Data.com
 Marion County maps: Current, Historic, KDOT

Townships in Marion County, Kansas
Townships in Kansas